Anneke "Ankie" Broekers-Knol (born 23 November 1946) is a Dutch politician and jurist who served as State Secretary for Justice and Security in the Third Rutte cabinet from 11 June 2019 until 10 January 2022. She is a member of the People's Party for Freedom and Democracy (VVD).

She previously served as a member of the Senate from 2 October 2001 until 11 June 2019 and as President of the Senate from 2 July 2013 to 11 June 2019. Broekers-Knol was chair of the Senate's standing committee for Security and Justice. She used to be director of the Department of Moot Court and Advocacy at Leiden University. She started her political career as a municipal councillor of Bloemendaal (1986–1997).

Electoral history

Decorations

References

External links

Official
  Mr. A. (Ankie) Broekers-Knol Parlement & Politiek
  Mr. A. Broekers-Knol (VVD) Eerste Kamer der Staten-Generaal

 
 

1946 births
Living people
Dutch academic administrators
Dutch legal educators
Dutch women academics
Dutch women jurists
Knights of the Order of Orange-Nassau
Leiden University alumni
Academic staff of Leiden University
Members of the Senate (Netherlands)
Municipal councillors in North Holland
People from Bloemendaal
People from Leiden
People's Party for Freedom and Democracy politicians
Presidents of the Senate (Netherlands)
State Secretaries for Justice of the Netherlands
Women government ministers of the Netherlands
20th-century Dutch educators
20th-century Dutch jurists
20th-century Dutch women politicians
20th-century Dutch politicians
21st-century Dutch educators
21st-century Dutch jurists
21st-century Dutch women politicians
21st-century Dutch politicians
20th-century women educators
21st-century women educators